Gregory Ivan Combet  (born 28 April 1958) is a former Australian politician and trade unionist. He was Secretary of the Australian Council of Trade Unions between 1999 and 2007. He was elected member for the New South Wales Federal seat of Charlton for the Australian Labor Party at the 2007 election and was immediately appointed Parliamentary Secretary for Defence Procurement in the First Rudd Ministry on 3 December 2007. Combet was the Minister for Climate Change, Industry and Innovation in the Second Gillard Ministry before announcing his resignation from the ministry on 26 June 2013 following Julia Gillard's defeat in a leadership ballot. He previously served as Parliamentary Secretary for Climate Change, when Penny Wong was the Minister.

He retired from politics at the 2013 election. In 2020, Combet was appointed to the National COVID-19 Coordination Commission to "provide strategic and policy advice" for the Morrison Coalition Government.

Early life
Greg Combet was born in Sydney and attended Eastern Creek Primary school, then Rooty Hill High School from years 7 to 10. He completed his secondary education at Baulkham Hills High School. He was later educated at the University of New South Wales where he studied mining engineering, and then graduated from the University of Sydney with a Bachelor of Economics, and a Graduate Diploma in Labour Relations and the Law. He was a project officer for the New South Wales Tenants' Union, before working for the Lidcombe Workers' Health Centre. In 1987, he was employed by the Waterside Workers' Federation, now part of the Maritime Union of Australia.

Union activity
Combet's association with the Australian Council of Trade Unions (ACTU) began in 1993 when he became a Senior Industrial Officer. In 1996 he was elected Assistant Secretary and in 1999 following the retirement of Bill Kelty, he became Secretary. Over his time at the ACTU, Combet has co-ordinated many union campaigns, and rose to prominence during the 1998 Australian waterfront dispute. Combet also led successful campaigns to secure entitlements and compensation for the staff of the collapsed airline Ansett Australia and asbestos victims of the James Hardie company. In his capacity as Secretary of the ACTU, Combet led the Rights at Work campaign against the Howard Government's WorkChoices industrial relations law changes.

Parliament

On 4 May 2007 Combet announced his intention to run for the safe Labor seat of Charlton in Newcastle, New South Wales. The sitting member for Charlton, Kelly Hoare, expressed anger at losing preselection for her seat, and for a time considered running as an independent.

Combet stood down as ACTU Secretary to campaign full-time in Charlton in the lead up to the federal election. On 14 June 2007 Jeff Lawrence, National Secretary of the Liquor, Hospitality and Miscellaneous Union (LHMU) was elected unopposed as the next Secretary of the ACTU.

Combet was elected as the new member for Charlton on 24 November 2007 as part of the ALP's victory in the 2007 Australian federal election, achieving a two party preferred swing of 4.47 per cent, winning 62.87 per cent of the two party vote. Following the election, Prime Minister Kevin Rudd appointed Combet as Parliamentary Secretary for Defence Procurement in the First Rudd Ministry. He was sworn in on 3 December 2007. In February 2009, Combet was appointed Parliamentary Secretary for Climate Change, with a focus on emissions trading, to assist Climate Change Minister Senator Penny Wong.

As a result of the resignation of Defence Minister Joel Fitzgibbon and the subsequent ministerial reshuffle, Combet was promoted to the ministry on 6 June 2009, as Minister for Defence Personnel, Materiel and Science and Minister Assisting the Minister for Climate Change. Combet's portfolio was amended into April 2010 to Minister Assisting the Minister for Climate Change and Energy Efficiency and Minister for Defence Materiel and Science and to help him focus on the Government's energy efficiency programs, he axed part of this scheme—Home Insulation Program (HIP) in late April due to the safety risks and the blow-out in funding.

Combet was re-elected to Charlton at the 2010 federal election, suffering a post-redistribution two party swing of 0.24 per cent, winning 62.67 per cent of the two party vote. After Labor was returned to government in this election, Combet entered Cabinet, succeeding Wong as Minister for Climate Change and Energy Efficiency. Following the passage of the government's Clean Energy Bill, the portfolio of Industry and Innovation was added to Combet's responsibilities. Combet had decided to step down over health concerns prior to Prime Minister Gillard's defeat in a leadership spill on 26 June 2013, but brought this decision forward and announced he would step down as minister and not contest his seat in the upcoming election. The seat of Charlton was subsequently won for the ALP by Combet's former advisor and chief-of-staff Pat Conroy.

Subsequent activities

Since leaving parliament, Combet has worked as a consultant to unions, governments and business and as a company director. Combet works primarily with industry superannuation funds and in December 2018 became chair of Industry Super Australia and Chair of IFM Investors, a global asset management business owned by the industry superannuation funds.

In 2020, in response to the COVID-19 Pandemic, Combet was appointed to "provide strategic and policy advice" for the Liberal Morrison Government.

Combet, writing in The Guardian in late‑2021, describes Australia's failed climate policies and argues that a sensible energy transition is indeed possible.

Personal life
On 12 June 2006, Combet was appointed a Member of the Order of Australia for service to industrial relations and through advocacy for the improved health and safety of workers, including people affected by asbestos-related diseases, and to the community.

Combet is separated from his second wife and in 2012 began a relationship with ABC-TV newsreader Juanita Phillips.

Combet is the son of a winemaker and grew up on the Penfolds Minchinbury Estate in western Sydney. He is well known for breeding Gouldian finches.

In 2014, Combet published his autobiography The Fights of My Life.

In the 2007 ABC-TV series Bastard Boys, dramatising the 1998 Australian waterfront dispute, in which Combet was heavily involved, the role of Combet was played by Daniel Frederiksen.

See also
 First Rudd Ministry
 First Gillard Ministry
 Second Gillard Ministry

References

External links

Profile at NSW Labor Party
 
Greg Combet at OurCampaigns.com
Profile at ABC News
The Hon Greg Combet AM MP speech to the National Press Club of Australia
 Profile at ACTU
 Your Rights At Work

1958 births
Living people
Australian Labor Party members of the Parliament of Australia
Australian mining engineers
Australian trade unionists
Government ministers of Australia
Members of the Australian House of Representatives
Members of the Australian House of Representatives for Charlton
Members of the Cabinet of Australia
Members of the Order of Australia
People educated at Baulkham Hills High School
Politicians from Sydney
University of New South Wales alumni
University of Sydney alumni
21st-century Australian politicians